Leslie Odom Jr. is the self-titled debut jazz album by actor and singer Leslie Odom Jr. An early version of the album, recorded prior to Odom's success in the 2015 Broadway musical Hamilton, was self-released in 2014. After Odom was signed to S-Curve Records in 2016, an expanded and revised version of the album was recorded. Released by S-Curve in June 2016, the album reached No. 1 on the Billboard Jazz charts.

2014 version
Odom started a Kickstarter page for the album, raising $40,791 for the project. Recording began in April 2013 and ended in February 2014. The slow recording process was due to Odom's busy schedule, which included his off-Broadway show Venice, his starring role on Smash, and his recurring roles on Person of Interest and Law & Order: Special Victims Unit. After multiple promotional concerts at The Public Theater, the album was released through CD Baby on August 12, 2014.

The album received positive reviews. David Clarke of Broadway World wrote, "Fans and newcomers alike can revel in the glory of his decadently jazzy debut solo album, and after just one listen, I'm sure that you'll be hooked... There is a crisp smoothness to Leslie Odom Jr.'s voice that is entirely fascinating, and his self-titled debut album puts his instrument on full display."

2016 version
Odom was signed to a four-album deal with S-Curve Records in 2016, as a result of his then-current role in the hit Broadway musical Hamilton. He and producer Steve Greenberg narrowed down 200 potential tunes to ten tracks, and Odom recorded an updated and improved version of Leslie Odom Jr. during days off and afternoons before Broadway performances, in order to release the album before Odom left Hamilton.

Six tracks were kept for the new version, and three songs – "Sarah", "Song for the Asking", and "Wild Is the Wind" – were cut. Four new songs were added, with changes to the track order. One of the newly recorded songs, "Autumn Leaves", was released as a single before the album came out.

Released on June 10, 2016, the album charted at No. 1 on Billboard Jazz and No. 147 on Billboard 200.

Odom toured to promote the album, performing concerts backed by a five-piece jazz quintet that includes a drummer, percussionist, bassist, guitarist, and a pianist who is also Odom's musical director.

Track listing

2014 version

2016 version

Charts

References

2014 debut albums
Leslie Odom Jr. albums
S-Curve Records albums